Nelyubov is a Russian-language surname. The feminine form of this name is Nelyubova.

People
Grigori Nelyubov (1934–1966), Soviet cosmonaut
Olga Nelyubova (born 1964), Russian middle-distance runner

Russian-language surnames